Brant Woodward (born 4 March 1962) is a New Zealand sport shooter. He competed at the 2000 Summer Olympics in Sydney, in the men's trap.

References

1962 births
Living people
New Zealand male sport shooters
Olympic shooters of New Zealand
Shooters at the 1996 Summer Olympics
Shooters at the 2000 Summer Olympics